Revo may refer to:

Transportation
Adam Revo, a small car manufactured by Pakistani automaker Adam Motor Company
Evolution Revo, an American ultralight trike design
Toyota Revo, an MPV produced by Toyota
The eighth generation of Toyota Hilux pickup, known as Revo in some countries

Entertainment
Revo (musician), the leader of Japanese music group Sound Horizon
R.E.V.O., a 2013 album by Walk Off the Earth

Computing
AspireRevo, a line of ION-based nettop computers by Acer
Psion Revo, a Personal Digital Assistant made by Psion
Revo Uninstaller, Microsoft Windows software to uninstall programs

Other uses
Revo (RC truck), a remote controlled truck manufactured by Traxxas
Revò, a comune in Italy
Revo Jõgisalu (1976–2011), Estonian rapper
Reta Vortaro, a  multi-language Internet-based Esperanto dictionary
Revo (organisation), a non-profit professional body and membership organisation in the United Kingdom serving the retail property and placemaking industry
Revo (climbing), a semi-automatic belay device for sports climbing
Revo, a brand of heat-not-burn cigarette introduced by  R. J. Reynolds Tobacco Company as a variation of their Eclipse (cigarette) product

See also 
 Revolt (disambiguation)